New York–Addis–London: The Story of Ethio Jazz 1965–1975 is a compilation album of work by jazz artist Mulatu Astatke. The album covers his early recordings in the UK in 1965, his work on the Worthy label in New York and his recording in Addis on Amha, Phillips and Axum in the 1970s. The album received the "Best New Reissue" honor from Pitchfork Media.

Track listing

References 

2009 compilation albums
Mulatu Astatke albums